The 2003 Gael Linn Cup, the most important representative competition for elite level participants in the women's team field sport of camogie, was won by Munster, who defeated Ulster in the final, played at Portmarnock.

Arrangements
Munster defeated an under-strength Connacht side 2–20 to 1–3. Ulster defeated Leinster 1–20 to 4–2. Munster pulled away in the closing stages of the final to defeat Ulster by 3–13 to 1–9 at Portmarnock Naomh Mearnóg.

Gael Linn Trophy
Ulster defeated Leinster 2–7 to 1–7. Munster defeated Connacht 3–15 to 0–4. Munster defeated Ulster 4–7 to 0–5 in the final.

Final stages

|}

Junior Final

|}
 
|}

References

External links
 Camogie Association

2003 in camogie
2003